Zambrana is a town and municipality located in the province of Álava, in the Basque region of northern Spain. It may be the origin of the popular Hispanic surname Zambrano.

External links

References

 auto

Municipalities in Álava